John Salusbury (died 29 October 1685) was a Welsh politician who sat in the House of Commons  at various times between 1626 and 1643. He supported the Royalist cause in the English Civil War.

Salusbury was the son of Roger or Robert Salusbury and his wife Catherine Clough, daughter of Sir Richard Clough. 

In 1626 Salusbury was elected Member of Parliament for Flint. He was elected MP for  Denbigh in the Short Parliament in April 1640 and was elected MP for Flint again for the Long Parliament in November 1640. He was disabled from sitting in Parliament on 5 February 1643 for joining the King at Oxford.

After the Restoration in 1660 Salusbury was one of those nominated Knight of the Royal Oak. He was Colonel of Denbighshire Horse Militia in 1666.
 
Salusbury died at a great age in 1685.

Salusbury married Elizabeth Ravenscroft, daughter of Thomas Ravenscroft of Bretton.

References

Year of birth missing
1685 deaths
Members of the Parliament of England (pre-1707) for constituencies in Wales
English MPs 1626
English MPs 1640 (April)
English MPs 1640–1648